The Hour of Peril: The Secret Plot to Murder Lincoln Before the Civil War is a book by Daniel Stashower published by Minotaur Books (Under St. Martin's Press which is now held by Macmillan Publishers) on 29 January 2013 & later won 4 literary awards.

Awards

External links 
 Book review on The Washington Post
 Saving Mr. Lincoln. ‘The Hour of Peril,’ by Daniel Stashower as featured on The New York Times
 Edgar Award Winner Daniel Stashower on Lincoln, True Crime and History as on The Wall Street Journal
 As listed on Barnes & Noble

References 

American non-fiction books
Crime books
Agatha Award-winning works
Anthony Award-winning works
Macavity Award-winning works
Edgar Award-winning works
Minotaur Books books